Ahmed Omar Maiteeg is a Libyan businessman and politician originally from Misrata, who was elected Prime Minister of Libya in May 2014. He was appointed head of the transitional government, and asked to form his cabinet and present it to the GNC (the General National Congress) for a confidence vote within 15 days.

The appointment makes the 42-year-old businessman Libya's youngest and fifth premier since long-time autocrat Muammar Gaddafi was toppled and killed in a 2011 uprising. His election as prime minister took place under disputed circumstances. The Justice Ministry decided on 29 May that Maiteeg was not the Prime Minister due to voting procedural issue occurred when the First Deputy of GNC left the session without valid reason. The Libyan Supreme Court was expected to issue a verdict on 5 June 2014 regarding the election of Maiteeq, although it indicated on that day that it believed that the appointment of Maiteeq was invalid, the court stated that appeals should be heard and delayed a final ruling until 9 June. The court ruled on 9 June that Maiteeq appointment was invalid;
Abdullah al-Thani is expected to stay on as prime minister. Maiteeq submitted his resignation voluntarily in same day.

He was later nominated in Late 2015 to be a member of the presidential council and deputy prime minister in the newly formed Government of National Accord (GNA). The Government of National Accord (Arabic: حكومة الوفاق الوطني) was an interim government for Libya that was formed under the terms of the Libyan Political Agreement, a United Nations–led initiative, signed on 17 December 2015 in Skhirat, Morocco. In March 2016, he became Deputy Prime minister and vice-president of the Presidential Council.

In 2017, he was elected to be the Chairman of the Council of the Arab Youth and Sports Ministers. Additionally, he is an active member of the Libyan business council that is working towards more effective role for the private sector in the development of the Libyan economy.

His appointment ended upon the formation of The Government of National Unity (Arabic: حكومة الوحدة الوطنية, Hukumat al Wahdat al Watania) that was formed on 10 March 2021 as a result of the Libyan Political Dialogue Forum on 5 February 2021 with the aim to unify the rival Government of National Accord based in Tripoli and the Second Al-Thani Cabinet based in Tobruk.

Early life and education 
Born into a prominent family from Misrata, Maiteeq was born on a 1972 in Misrata, Libya. His father held a number of high offices during the monarchical period prior to the Gaddafi regime. He was also the grandson of the Libyan freedom fighter, Ramadan Asswehly. He was graduated from the center of International Business Studies fromArab European University, Parma in Italy, and holds a degree in global economic studies from the University of London (1994). Upon completion of his studies, Maiteeg returned to Libya to manage his family businesses in the field of construction and real state development. Ref https://ahmedmaiteeg.com/en/for-mr-ahmed-omar-maitiq/

2011 civil war 
During the Libyan Civil War, he was a member of the Chamber for the Liberation of Tripoli during the conflict and a member of the Tripoli Development and Stability Council after the fall of the regime.

Prime Minister and Deputy Prime Minister 
Following Acting Prime Minister Abdullah al-Thani's call that he would resign on 13 April for an alleged attack on his family, he was persuaded to stay on till a new leader was elected. The first day of voting on 28 April was disrupted by armed men firing in parliament. In a voting session at the General National Congress that was described by Al Jazeera English as "chaotic," Maiteeq was elected, and took the oath, "I swear I will carry out my duties honestly and in devotion." Later MP Fathi al-Majbari told Libyan television station Al-Ahrar: "There are violations in today's session" and that a certain alteration of the votes had occurred after the session was adjourned." Ultimately in the days that followed, the Libyan Supreme Court ruled that the election of Maiteeq had been invalid, and the previous Prime Minister, al-Thani, agreed to return to office.

al-Thani, had earlier signed an agreement with those holding the smaller oil export terminals of Hariga and Zueitina, those holding the larger Ras Lanuf and Es Sider terminals refused to recognise Maiteeq. Spokesman Ali Hasi said: "Maiteeq came to power illegally."

Maiteeq identifies as an independent and as not affiliated to any political party or movement.

In March 2017, he had a meeting in Moscow with the Special Representative of the President of Russia for the Middle East and Africa, Mikhail Bogdanov, where they discussed the ongoing Libyan crisis and solutions for resolving the conflict, including the possibility of negotiations between the GNA and the Tobruk-based House of Representatives.

See also 
 Maiteeq Cabinet

References 

1972 births
Living people
Libyan people of Turkish descent
Libyan businesspeople
Prime Ministers of Libya
People from Tripoli, Libya
Members of the Presidential Council (Libya)
21st-century Libyan politicians